The IKCO Tara (code name: K132) is a compact (C-segment) sedan produced by Iranian carmaker Iran Khodro since 2021. This car is a derivative of the Peugeot 301 and is based on Iran Khodro's IKP1 platform, which is a modified version of the PSA PF1 platform. As a result, the platform is shared with the Peugeot 208, Peugeot 2008 and Citroën C-Elysée.

History 
After the JCPOA was announced, Iran Khodro and Peugeot Citroën intended to jointly produce the Peugeot 301, Peugeot 208 and Peugeot 2008 as the IKAP (Iran Khodro Automobile Peugeot) joint venture. After the return of sanctions by the United States, Peugeot left Iran and IKAP was suspended. As a result, Iran Khodro modified the Peugeot 301 to produce it indigenously and the result was the Tara, which was unveiled for the first time on February 19, 2020 on the sidelines of the cabinet meeting by Hassan Rouhani. The K132 was officially unveiled by the Iran Khodro Company at a SAPCO facility. The car was pre-sold for the first time on July 8, 2020.

Design
Parts of the side frame, cabin and roof frame of this car are common with the Peugeot 301 and Citroën C3-XR, and most changes have been made in the design of the front and rear of the car. According to Iran Khodro, this car is "92% internalized".

Technical features
The car will be produced with two gearbox options (manual and automatic). The car uses the TU5P engine, which is improved version of the PSA TU5 engine modified by IKCO to add CVVT variable valve timing system. The engine is 1600 cc, 4-cylinder, 16-valve indirect injection engine produces  and 144 Nm. It has a double overhead camshaft. The length of the car is 4519 mm, the width of the car is 1953 mm (1748 mm without side mirrors) and the height is 1466 mm. The weight of the empty vehicle with a full tank and manual transmission is 1170 kg (1268 kg with the automatic transmission); It has a 50 liter fuel tank, meets the Euro5 emission standard and is equipped with electric power steering. The maximum speed is 190 km/h and the car's acceleration from 0 to 100 km/h in the manual and automatic models are 12.5 and 13 seconds respectively.

Gallery

See also 

 Saipa Shahin

References

Cars of Iran
2020s cars
Tara
Compact cars
Sedans
Front-wheel-drive vehicles
Cars introduced in 2020